Nicht von dieser Welt ("Not from This World") is the debut studio album by German singer Xavier Naidoo, released on by Pelham Power Productions (3P) on 30 May 1998 in German-speaking Europe.

Track listing
All songs produced by Moses Pelham and Martin Haas.

Charts

Weekly charts

Year-end charts

Certifications and sales

Release history

References

External links
 

1998 albums
Xavier Naidoo albums